Louis Cameron (born 21 May 1992) is an Australian former first class cricketer for the Victoria cricket team. He played as a right-handed batsman and a right arm fast-medium bowler.

Career
Cameron made his Sheffield Shield debut in the 2012–13 season when he was awarded a rookie professional contract. Cameron finished with 3/61 from 19 overs on his debut against New South Wales at the Sydney Cricket Ground before also playing against South Australia but going wicket less.

Post-playing career
Pursuing career in journalism, Cameron has worked for Cricket Australia's digital media team. Cameron has written for Cricket Network.

References

Australian cricketers
Living people
Victoria cricketers
1992 births